The Women's Army Auxiliary Corps (WAAC) can refer to:

 Women's Army Auxiliary Corps (Britain), a branch of the British military in the First World War
 Women's Auxiliary Corps (India), India branch WWII
 Women's Auxiliary Army Corps (New Zealand), a branch of the New Zealand military in World War II
 prior name of the Women's Army Corps, a branch of the U.S. military in World War II

See also
 Women's Auxiliary Corps (India)